Terence A. Duggan (15 April 1932 – 1 May 2008) was a British comedian and actor who had a successful career in cabaret and variety, and played numerous character roles on television.

Early life 
Duggan was born in Hoxton, London. From the 1960s through the 1980s, he appeared on such television series as Are You Being Served?, The Bill, Bob Martin, Only Fools and Horses, Please Sir! and Randall and Hopkirk (Deceased). He also performed pantomime, frequently teaming with his wife, the actress Anna Karen. He also appeared in different roles with her on six occasions in the ITV sitcom On the Buses, as well as in the spin-off movie On the Buses (1971).

He was also a stand-up comedian who was noted for his drunk sketches in which he portrayed an inebriated man, a concept earlier popularised by Freddie Frinton and Jimmy James. Besides practising theatrical performance from childhood, he learned acrobatics which led to film stuntman roles. Duggan was also a member of the entertainers' charity The Grand Order of Water Rats.

Personal life and death 
Duggan died on 1 May 2008, aged 76, following a long illness.

Filmography

Film

Television

References

External links 

English male film actors
English male soap opera actors
1932 births
2008 deaths
People from Hoxton